Lydian is a calligraphic humanist sans-serif typeface designed by Warren Chappell for American Type Founders in 1938. It is available in bold, italic, and condensed, as well as in a Cursive variant. The original foundry font was commissioned and cast by American Type Founders and included a stylistic alternate, a capital ‹A› with a cross bar. It was named after the designer's wife. 

The various members of the family were introduced over the course of eight years:

 Lydian Italic (1938)
 Lydian Bold Italic (1938)
 Lydian Cursive (1940)
 Lydian Condensed Italic (1946)

References 

Sans-serif typefaces
American Type Founders typefaces
Display typefaces
Typefaces and fonts introduced in 1938